Ehab Tawfik ( is an Egyptian singer and actor. He performs mostly in the shababi genre of Egyptian popular music. He has also recorded songs in the watani (nationalistic) tradition, among them "Set saʿat" ('Six Hours'), released as an overtly pro-military video shortly after the military coup d'état which removed Mohamed Morsi from power in 2013.

Personal life
Tawfik married Nada Rizk after the age of 40, with whom he has a twin boys, Ahmad and Mahmoud in 2008, and a girl, Jude in 2014.

His father, Ahmad, died from a blaze in his villa in Nasr City in January 2020, six years after his wife died.

Hits
His hit songs include "Habibi" ("My Darling"), "Sahrany" ("She Enchanted Me"), "Tetraga Feya" ("Begging Me"), "Hobbak Aliminni" ("Your Love Taught Me"), and Allah Alek Ya Seede have all been popular in Arabic speaking countries.

References

Living people
20th-century Egyptian male singers
Egyptian singer-songwriters
21st-century Egyptian male singers
Egyptian male film actors
Egyptian male television actors
Year of birth missing (living people)